Music Machine may also refer to:

The Music Machine, a 1960s American rock band
The Music Machine (film), a 1979 film
Music Machine (album series), a series of children's music albums and videos including:
Music Machine (Candle album), 1977
Music Machine II
Music Machine III
Music Machine Club Fun Album
Music Machine (film), a 1991 film based the albums
Music Machine (Melody Club album), a music album by Melody Club
Music Machine, a music album by Erik Norlander
The Music Machine starring Jet-Boot Jack, US title of the 1983 video game Jet-Boot Jack
KOKO (music venue), a live-music venue in London, formerly known as The Music Machine
The Music Machine (video game), see List of Atari 2600 games
Music Machine, a video release by Hi-5
RAM Music Machine, a music add-on for the ZX Spectrum